Mu Nianci is a character in the wuxia novel The Legend of the Condor Heroes by Jin Yong (Louis Cha). She is the romantic interest of the antagonist, Yang Kang, and the mother of Yang Guo, the protagonist in the sequel novel, The Return of the Condor Heroes. Jin Yong describes her appearance as "firm like a piece of jade, despite appearing weather-beaten, she is beautiful, with bright eyes and sparkling white teeth."

Mu Nianci and Qin Nanqin
The Mu Nianci in the latest revision of The Legend of the Condor Heroes is actually an amalgam of the original Mu Nianci and another character, Qin Nanqin. In the first edition, Mu Nianci is Yang Kang's love interest but not Yang Guo's mother. Qin Nanqin lives with her grandfather and they catch snakes for a living. She develops a crush on Guo Jing after he saves her. However, she is raped by Yang Kang and Mu Nianci arrives too late to stop him. Qin Nanqin becomes pregnant and gives birth to Yang Guo and thereafter becomes a nun and travels with Mu Nianci before settling down to raise her child. After Yang Kang was poisoned, Mu Nianci performs a coup de grâce on him and commits suicide to join him in death. Qin Nanqin went on to give birth to Yang Guo, and raised the boy until when she was bitten by a poisonous snake while trying to protect her son at the time Yang Guo was five years old. Before dying, Qin Nanqin entrusts her son to Guo Jing. Jin Yong felt that Qin Nanqin's role was unnecessary so he merged Mu Nianci and Qin Nanqin into a single character when he revised the novel.

Roles in the novels
Mu Nianci was from a village in Lin'an (present-day Hangzhou). She became an orphan shortly after birth when an epidemic killed her family. Months before, her family offered shelter to an injured Mu Yi, who was escaping from Duan Tiande. When Mu Yi returned to her home to offer help, he saw that she was the only survivor in her family of seven (her parents and four brothers died) and decided to adopt the girl to repay her family's kindness. When Mu Nianci became older, Mu Yi decided that it is time for him to find a suitable spouse for her. They travel around the land and stage martial arts contests for interested men to participate. The contestant must defeat Mu Nianci to win her hand-in-marriage but none has managed to overcome her yet. She learnt some martial arts from Hong Qigong after a brief encounter with him earlier, in addition to those already taught to her by Mu Yi.

Once, Mu Yi and Mu Nianci arrive in the capital of the Jin Empire to stage another contest. A young Jurchen prince, Wanyan Kang, joins the contest out of mischief and defeats Mu Nianci easily. According to the rules of the contest, Wanyan Kang must marry Mu Nianci but he refuses. He molested Mu Nianci during the contest and took her shoe as a souvenir. Mu Yi, who is displeased with Wanyan Kang's attitude, insists that Wanyan marries his daughter. Wanyan Kang turns violent and shoves Mu Yi away. Guo Jing, who has been watching nearby, stands up for Mu Yi and chides Wanyan Kang for his behavior. Guo Jing and Wanyan Kang then start fighting with each other.

Just then, the prince's mother, Bao Xiruo, arrives on the scene and stops the fight. Mu Yi recognises Bao Xiruo and is stunned. Mu Yi is actually Bao Xiruo's husband, Yang Tiexin, who was apparently killed 19 years ago. Wanyan Kang is in fact Yang Tiexin's biological son, Yang Kang. Wanyan Kang (Yang Kang) refuses to acknowledge his father and his parents commit suicide after being cornered by Wanyan Honglie. Before dying, Yang Tiexin learns that the young man who stood up for him earlier is his late sworn brother's son. He decides that Guo Jing could be a suitable spouse for his foster daughter. However, both of them refuse his arrangement because Guo Jing is already romantically involved with Huang Rong while Mu Nianci has romantic feelings for Yang Kang.

Mu Nianci attempts to kill Wanyan Honglie to avenge her foster father but Yang Kang intervenes and stops her. In fact, Yang Kang has fallen in love with her ever since he first met her during the contest. Their relationship gradually becomes more complicated. Yang Kang is unwilling to give up his status as a Jurchen noble so he can enjoy wealth, fame and power. Mu Nianci tries to persuade him to give up and follow her to be a commoner. Yang Kang reveals his treacherous nature and collaborates with the Jurchens to exploit his own race while lying to Mu Nianci that he has changed.

Mu Nianci discovers Yang Kang's villainous deeds eventually and decides to leave him for good. They never met each other again. However, she is already pregnant with his child and still loves him despite his misdeeds. She gives birth to a son shortly after Yang Kang's death. The infant is named "Yang Guo" by Guo Jing, who hopes that the boy will redeem his family's honour by doing good. Mu Nianci raises Yang Guo all by herself for 11 years before dying from illness. Following his mother's instructions before her demise, Yang Guo had her remains cremated and buried at the Temple of the Iron Spear, in the hope of reuniting her with his father in death.

Martial arts and skills

Carefree Fist
When she was 13, Mu Nianci learnt the Carefree Fist from Hong Qigong in a ruined temple in Xinyang. Using the early martial arts training by her foster father as a foundation, she masters the skill within three days. When a combatant utilises the skill, he or she is elegant, extremely light, agile, and appears as if he or she is dancing. Every motion is as beautiful as that of a jade yanornis or huge eagle.

In film and television
Notable actresses who have portrayed Mu Nianci in films and television series include Kara Hui (1977–1978), Sharon Yeung (1983), Emily Kwan (1994), Jiang Qinqin (2003), Liu Shishi (2008), Zhao Liying (2014) and Meng Ziyi (2017).

Family tree

Notes

References
  Tan, Xianmao (2005). Mu Nianci: True Love Comes to Nothing in the End. In Rankings of Jin Yong's Characters. Chinese Agricultural Press.
  Tan, Xianmao (2005). Qin Nanqin: A Character Worthy of Memory. In Rankings of Jin Yong's Characters. Chinese Agricultural Press.

Fictional adoptees
Fictional Han people
Fictional Song dynasty people
Fictional women soldiers and warriors
Fictional wushu practitioners
Jin Yong characters
The Legend of the Condor Heroes
Literary characters introduced in 1959
Orphan characters in literature
The Return of the Condor Heroes